Gostyukhinskogo karyera is a rural locality (a settlement) in Klyazminskoye Rural Settlement, Kovrovsky District, Vladimir Oblast, Russia. The population was 41 as of 2010.

Geography 
Gostyukhinskogo karyera is located 10 km east of Kovrov (the district's administrative centre) by road. Ashcherino is the nearest rural locality.

References 

Rural localities in Kovrovsky District